Jennifer Lilian Cashmore  (born 5 December 1937) (previously, and for most of her political career, known as Mrs Jennifer Adamson) is a former Australian politician. She was a Liberal Party member of the South Australian House of Assembly between 1977 and 1993, representing the eastern suburbs seat of Coles (Morialta since 2002). She was the third woman to be elected to the House of Assembly.

She served as Minister for Health and Minister for Tourism during the 1979–1982 Tonkin government, the first woman member of Cabinet since Joyce Steele.
In 1992 she contested the leadership of her party against John Olsen and Dean Brown, the eventual winner.

Once dubbed the 'green conscience' of the Liberal Party, Cashmore was the first member to raise questions about the financial viability of the State Bank before the 1989 election.

Cashmore is the mother of South Australian Governor Frances Adamson, NSW Supreme Court judge Christine Adamson and Anglican chaplain Stuart Adamson.

See also
Women and government in Australia
Women in the South Australian House of Assembly

References

External links 
 
 

1937 births
Living people
Members of the South Australian House of Assembly
Liberal Party of Australia members of the Parliament of South Australia
Members of the Order of Australia
Women members of the South Australian House of Assembly